Oinam Bembem Devi (born 4 April 1980) is a retired Indian footballer from Imphal, Manipur. In 2017, she was honoured with the Arjuna Award by the Ministry of Youth Affairs and Sports. She was nicknamed the Durga of Indian Football and is currently involved in spreading awareness about Women's football in India.

Oinam Bembem Devi is the recipient of India's highly prestigious award Padma Shri 2020.

Early life and club career
Devi began her career as a footballer in 1988 when she began training at the United Pioneers Club in Imphal. In 1991, she was selected to represent the Manipur U-13 team in the sub-junior football tournament. Her performances in the tournament got noticed, and was signed up by Yawa Singjamei Leishangthem Lekai club, and two years later, by the Social Union Nascent (SUN) Club.

At the national level, Devi is a regular member of the Manipur state football team for woman since the year 1993. She has been appointed the captain of her state team since the 32nd National Games held in Hyderabad, where she led her state to victory.

On 9 June 2014, Maldivian football club New Radiant, announced the signing of Devi and another Indian youngster Lako Phuti Bhutia. Bembem Devi made her debut as a late 1st half substitute, in their match against Maldives police service on 11 June and her speed and skill were a constant threat to the opposition as Bembem provided two assists in her team's 4–0 win.

In the match against defending champions Sun hotels and resorts, Bembem scored in both halves to help New Radiant WSC to a comfortable 4–0 win, securing them a spot in the semi finals against Sun Hotels and  Resorts. In the Semi-finals, they defeated Sun hotels and resorts 5–1 and entered the final. The Final match was held on 21 June 2014 between New Radiant SC and Maldives National Defence Force. Bembem Devi scored in 9th and 26th minute of the match, to help New Radiant WSC achieve a historic 5–1 win over MNDF to win the league.

Bembem Devi ended up as the top scorer of the tournament with 6 goals in just 3 matches. She also provided 4 assists and she was awarded the Player of The Tournament for her excellent performances.

International career
At the age of 15, Bembem made her international debut against Guam in the Asian Women's Championships.

The turning point in her career came at the 1996 Asian Games, where the Indian national team were drawn in a group alongside Japan and neighbours Nepal. They lost to Japan 1-0 and won against Nepal 1-0 to progress from the group with Japan. In round 2 they would be drawn in a tough group alongside the national teams of Uzbekistan, Turkmenistan and North Korea. They lost all their matches but by then Oinam Bemben Devi had announced her arrival at the national stage.

Before the 1997 AFC Cup in China, the Indian eve's team were sent to Germany for a month-long camp, where the national team players were trained by German coaches and played against German oppositions. The camp proved vital as the Indian team won 3-0 against Hong-Kong, Japan the top ranked team in women’ s football, defeated India 1-0 and in their final group game encounter India thrashed Guam 10-0.

She was given the armband of the Indian contingent in the AFC qualifying competition, held in Thailand in 2003. She was the captain of the Indian team that emerged winners at the 11th South Asian Games held in Bangladesh, in 2010 and the 2012 SAFF Women's Championship held in Sri Lanka in the year 2012.

She wears no. 6 jersey for India.

She is set to play her last game on 15 February against Nepal, at the 12th South Asian Games in Shillong.

Career statistics

As manager 
Devi was appointed as manager of Eastern Sporting Union in 2017 Indian Women's League final rounds. She also became the first manager of Indian Women's League history to claim the tournament title also as a player. In 2018, she was assigned as the assistant coach for the India U17 women's team.

In the 2018–19 Indian Women's League season, she managed Manipur Police Sports Club.

Honours

Player

India
 South Asian Games Gold medal: 2010, 2016
 SAFF Women's Championship: 2010, 2012, 2014

Eastern Sporting Union
 Indian Women's League: 2016–17

Manipur
Senior Women's National Football Championship: 2013–14

New Radiant WSC
FAM Women's Football Championship: 2014, 2015

Manager

Eastern Sporting Union
 Indian Women's League: 2016–17

Manipur
 Senior Women's National Football Championship: 2021–22

Individual
 FAM Premier League Player of the Tournament: 2014–15
 AIFF Women's Player of the Year (2): 2001, 2013
 Arjuna Award: 2017
  Padma Shri: 2020

See also
 List of Indian football players in foreign leagues

References

Bibliography

External links
 Indian Express, Football Nationals
 Bembem Devi profile
Two Indian players join Women's team

1980 births
Living people
People from Imphal
Indian women's footballers
India women's international footballers
Expatriate women's footballers in the Maldives
New Radiant S.C. players
Sportswomen from Manipur
Footballers at the 1998 Asian Games
Footballers at the 2014 Asian Games
Women's association football midfielders
Footballers from Manipur
21st-century Indian women
21st-century Indian people
Eastern Sporting Union players
South Asian Games gold medalists for India
Asian Games competitors for India
Recipients of the Padma Shri in sports
South Asian Games medalists in football
Indian expatriate women's footballers
Indian football coaches
Indian football managers
Recipients of the Arjuna Award
Indian Women's League players